1,2-Propanedithiol, sometimes called 1,2-dimercaptopropane, is a thiol with the formula HSCHCH(SH)CH.  This colorless, intensely odorous liquid is the simplest chiral dithiol.  Related dithiols include 1,2-ethanedithiol, 2,3-dimercapto-1-propanesulfonic acid, and 1,3-propanedithiol.  It is generated by the addition of HS to the related episulfide, CHCHCHS.

Refractive index = 1.531-1.541

References

External links

Thiols
Foul-smelling chemicals